China Newsweek is a Chinese weekly magazine since 2000 based in Beijing, China, and one of China's most well-known periodicals. Published by China News Service, the magazine provides extensive reports on current affairs and political news. 

On 25 September 1999, the first trial issue of China Newsweek was published, and was officially launched on 1 January 2000.

References

Magazines published in Beijing
News magazines published in Asia
Magazines established in 1999
1999 establishments in China
Weekly magazines published in China